Lalon Shah Bridge, locally known as Pakshey Bridge is a road bridge in Bangladesh over the river Padma, constructed by China Major Bridge Engineering Co., Ltd., situated between Ishwardi Upazila of Pabna on the east, and Bheramara Upazila of Kushtia on the west. Named after early 19th-century mystic poet Lalon Shah of Chhewuriya, Kushtia District, the bridge was completed in 2004.

It is on the N704. It provides important road connection to Mongla port of Khulna District in the south from Rajshahi division and Rangpur division, the northern part of Bangladesh.

It is situated parallel to and south (downstream) of Hardinge Bridge.

References

Road bridges in Bangladesh
Bridges completed in 2004
Bridges over the Ganges
Pabna District
Kushtia District
2004 establishments in Bangladesh